Kordian District is a district (bakhsh) in Jahrom County, Fars Province, Iran. At the 2006 census, its population was 14,025, in 3,391 families.  The District has one city: Qotbabad. The District has two rural districts (dehestan): Alaviyeh Rural District and Qotbabad Rural District.

References 

Jahrom County
Districts of Fars Province